The Democratic Action Party (abbreviation: DAP; ;) is a centre-left social democratic political party in Malaysia. As one of four component parties of the Pakatan Harapan (PH) coalition, it formed the federal government after defeating Barisan Nasional in the 2018 Malaysian general election, ending the party's 53 year-long stay in the opposition. However, before the coalition finished its first term, defections from partnering parties caused it to lose power after 22 months, culminating in the 2020 Malaysian political crisis. At the 2022 Malaysian general election, the PH coalition which the DAP was part of was returned to power again, albeit with a smaller majority leading it to form a unity government with political rivals.

The DAP was founded in 1965 by Malaya–based members of the Singaporean People's Action Party (PAP) Chen Man Hin and Devan Nair. The DAP had splintered from the PAP shortly after Singapore's expulsion from Malaysia in the same year, due to intense ideological differences between the ruling federal government United Malays National Organisation (UMNO), who favoured the idea of Ketuanan Melayu and Malay racial nationalism for the country, and the then state government the PAP, who favoured a more egalitarian and civic nationalist Malaysian Malaysia, which the DAP continues to espouse as one of its main ideologies today. The PAP, the ruling government of a now independent and sovereign Singapore, would form many of its policies over the decades influenced by the ideas the party had first espoused for the whole of Malaysia when Singapore was a state.

The DAP draws much of its support from secular and liberal voters with a stable electorate from voters of cities, coastal regions, the middle class (comprising professionals), and the working class. The party's strongholds are primarily in the urban and semi-urban areas of Penang, Perak, Selangor, Negeri Sembilan, Johor, Malacca and the Federal Territory of Kuala Lumpur. In the 2018 Malaysian general election, the party contested in 47 federal and 104 state constituencies under the banner of its ally the People's Justice Party, winning 42 and 102 seats respectively, except in Sarawak, where the party's state branch chose to contest under its own banner.

History

Formation 
On 11 October 1965, the DAP was formed by former members of the deregistered Malaysia branch of the Singapore–based People's Action Party (PAP), which was then known as the People's Action Party of Malaya prior to Singapore's expulsion. One of its co-founders include Bangsar Member of Parliament Devan Nair, who later returned to Singapore and became President of Singapore. The party formally registered itself as a democratic socialist party on 18 March 1966.

The ten members of the pro-tem committee were Devan Nair as secretary-general, Chen Man Hin (who won the Seremban state constituency as an independent) as chairman, D. P. Xavier as assistant secretary-general, Goh Hock Guan as vice-chairman, Seeveratnam Sinnathamby (younger brother of Singapore minister S. Rajaratnam) as treasurer and Zain Azahari bin Zainal Abidin, Chin Chan Sung, Michael Khong Chye Huat, Tan Chong Bee and Too Chee Cheong as members.

In the August of that year, the official party organ, The Rocket, was first published. At the first DAP National Congress held in Setapak, Kuala Lumpur on 29 July 1967, the DAP declared itself to be "irrevocably committed to the ideal of a free, democratic and socialist Malaysia, based on the principles of racial and religious equality, social and economic justice, and founded on the institution of parliamentary democracy".

In October that year, the DAP joined 55 other socialist parties belonging to the Socialist International at the SI International Conference in Zurich, Switzerland. Devan Nair, who was amongst those who founded the DAP, later returned to Singapore. Lee Kuan Yew, then Prime Minister of Singapore under the PAP, explained in 1981 that "the Cabinet decided that Singapore-Malaysia relations would always be bedevilled if Devan Nair remained a DAP leader. I persuaded him to come back".

Early electoral successes 
The DAP contested a general election for the first time in 1969. In line with their commitment to equality, the DAP originally campaigned against Bumiputera privileges, such as those afforded to them by Article 153 of the Constitution. They also continued Lee Kuan Yew's campaign for a "Malaysian Malaysia", the idea of which was originally conveyed by Lee in Parliament: "Malaysia – to whom does it belong? To Malaysians. But who are Malaysians? I hope I am, Mr Speaker, Sir. But sometimes, sitting in this chamber, I doubt whether I am allowed to be a Malaysian". The DAP went on to win 13 Parliamentary seats and 31 State Assembly seats, with 11.9% of all valid votes that were cast in the election; the Parti Gerakan Rakyat Malaysia (Gerakan) which campaigned on a similar platform also made major gains. The 1969 election marked the biggest gains ever made by an opposition party in Malaysia (before 2008), and came close to seeing the ruling Alliance toppled from power. However, a march made by the DAP along with Gerakan as part of the opposition team led to violence, and resulted in what was euphemistically termed the 13 May Incident. Parliament was suspended for two years, and the executive branch of the government assumed power.

When Parliament reconvened, it passed pieces of legislation such as the Sedition Act that illegalised discussion of repealing certain portions of the Constitution. Most of these concerned Bumiputra privileges, such as Article 153. The DAP and the People's Progressive Party were the only parties that voted against the Act, which passed by a vote of 125 to 17. After the 1969 election, the DAP would never come close to repeating its past successes for the next 38 years. Although the DAP remained a major opposition party, the ruling coalition had clung solidly to its two-thirds parliamentary majority. The DAP, however, continued campaigning on its platform of abolishing the Bumiputra privileges, giving equal rights for all Malaysians regardless of race and establishing a democratic socialist state in Malaysia. During the Mahathir administration in 1987, several DAP leaders, including Parliamentary Opposition Leader Lim Kit Siang, were detained by the government without trial during Operation Lalang, under the accusation of being a national security threat. It is widely believed they were arrested for protesting the expansion of the New Economic Policy.

1995–2008 
In 1995, the party ran what has become widely known as the "Robocop" campaign to wrest Penang from the Barisan Nasional. Despite the hype, the campaign was a failure as the party only won one state and three parliamentary seats. The strategy backfired when Prime Minister Mahathir, BN leaders and the media criticised Lim Kit Siang as a "robot" and "soulless" person.

Following the ousting of Deputy Prime Minister Anwar Ibrahim in September 1998, DAP co-founded the Barisan Alternatif coalition along with Pan-Malaysian Islamic Party and the newly formed People's Justice Party. However, the coalition did not work out very well for the DAP, with two of its top leaders, Lim Kit Siang and Karpal Singh losing their Parliamentary seats in the 1999 election; the DAP managed to win only 5% (10 out of 193) of the seats in Parliament. PAS became the leading opposition party in Parliament. It left the coalition in 2001 due to a disagreement with PAS over the issue of an Islamic state.

In the 2004 general election, the DAP managed to capture 12 seats in Parliament, while PAS and Keadilan suffered major setbacks, with PAS losing 20 of the 27 seats it had held after the 1999 elections, and Keadilan lost all seats except one returned after a recount. The eventual outcome saw Lim Kit Siang, who had been elected in his constituency of Ipoh Timur with a majority of 10,000 votes, formally elected as the leader of the opposition in Parliament, a post he had lost to the president of PAS in 1999.

In the 2006 Sarawak state election, the Democratic Action Party won 6 of the 12 seats it contested and narrowly lost three other seats with small majorities. Up til then it was the party's best showing ever in the history of Sarawak's state elections since 1979.

2008–2015 
Pakatan Rakyat was formed in 2008 by DAP, PKR and PAS. In the 2008 general election, the DAP won 13% (28 out of 222) of the seats in the Dewan Rakyat, with PAS and PKR making substantial gains as well with 23 seats and 31 seats respectively. In total, the taking of 82 seats (37%) by the opposition to Barisan Nasional's 140 seats (63%), makes it the best performance in Malaysian history by the opposition, and denied Barisan Nasional the two-thirds majority required to make constitutional changes in the Dewan Rakyat. DAP advisor Lim Kit Siang expressed surprise at the election results but declared it to be the true power of the voice of the Malaysian people for the leaders of the country to hear them. In addition, DAP, having secured all its contested seats in the state of Penang, formed the Penang state government with its alliance partners PKR and PAS, the Chief Minister being DAP's Lim Guan Eng, son of Lim Kit Siang.

In the 2011 Sarawak state election, DAP furthered its gains from the previous election, winning 12 out of the 70 state assembly seats, with PR winning a total of 15 state seats and 41% of the popular vote. The PR's success was further enhanced in the 2013 general election when DAP went on to win 17% (38 out of 222) of the seats in the Dewan Rakyat and the PR coalition won the popular vote, giving the BN government its worst election showing since independence. In 2015, the PR alliance broke up after a PAS Muktamar (General Assembly) motion unanimously approved the breaking of ties with DAP due to disagreements over PAS's decision to propose a private member's bill to implement "hudud" (Islamic penal code). Following PAS's decision to cut ties with DAP, DAP announced that PR had "ceased to exist".

At the DAP election in December 2012, Vincent Wu, who was initially declared to have secured the sixth spot with 1,202 votes, dropped to 26th place because he had actually secured only 669. Zairil Khir Johari was elected to the central executive committee (CEC) with 803 votes to secure the 20th spot. The glitch, reportedly because of a vote tabulation error due to the copy-and-paste method in Microsoft Excel, had raised suspicion. The DAP admitted to the counting error after discovering the mistake. The DAP election fiasco had caused unease among party members and led to protests to the Registrar of Societies (RoS). Two dissatisfied life members of the DAP then lodged reports with the RoS on the party elections following the revelations. Following the report the RoS had informed DAP of the dispute by its members and in turn as provided for under Section 3A of the Societies Act 1966 did recognise the office-bearers of the committee formed in the party elections on 15 December 2012, the point of contention.

DAP chairperson Karpal Singh said DAP will contest under the PAS logo for the Peninsula and PKR logo in Sabah and Sarawak in the 13th general election, following the Registrar of Societies' (RoS) failure to respond on the withdrawal letter of RoS informing that it does not recognise the party's top leadership line-up. DAP had appealed to the RoS to withdraw its letter to suspend the party's existing central executive committee (CEC) but the department was silent on the matter.

On 19 April 2013, DAP secretary-general Lim Guan Eng informed all its 51 parliament and 103 state candidates to use the rocket symbol first during nomination tomorrow, and show the Election Commission the letter of authorisation signed by secretary-general Lim Guan Eng. If the rocket symbol is rejected, then use the letter of authorisation signed by PAS secretary-general Mustafa Ali for Peninsula Malaysia and PKR letter of authorisation for Sabah and Sarawak. This came after the DAP decided to use PAS and PKR symbols for the coming general election on 5 May. He said the DAP headquarters in Kuala Lumpur received a letter by hand from the RoS at 10 p.m. on 19 April, stating that it had no objections to the DAP using the logo, and that the Election Commission (EC) had informed all returning officers to accept nominations from the DAP.

On 29 September 2013, DAP held a special congress to vote for a new Central Executive Committee.

2015–present 
On 22 September 2015, Pakatan Harapan was formed by DAP, PKR and National Trust Party to succeed PR. In the 2016 Sarawak state election, DAP lost its gains from the previous election, retained only 7 out of the 82 state assembly seats, with PH retained only a total of 10 state seats and 29.43% of the popular vote. On 12 February 2017, Kota Melaka MP, Sim Tong Him along with three other DAP state assemblymen from Melaka namely Goh (Duyong), Lim Jack Wong (Bachang), and Chin Choong Seong (Kesidang) announced their resignation from the party to be Independent, citing lack of trust in the party leadership. On 14 March 2017, PPBM officially joined PH as a member party. This made the coalition parties increase to four, where they competed in the 2018 general election against the BN coalition. During the election, PH achieved simple majority in Parliament when the coalition has secured 113 seats and finally able to form a new federal government through an early pact signed with Sabah Heritage Party. DAP won 42 seats out of the 47 seats it contested, making it the second-highest number of seats in PH behind PKR with 47 seats. Together with other coalition members, Lim Guan Eng and his peers took on ministerial roles in the newly formed cabinet. Lim became the Minister of Finance of the current ruling government when Mahathir announced the initial 10 minister portfolio holders. He subsequently became the first Malaysian Chinese to hold the post in 44 years since Tun Tan Siew Sin of Malaysian Chinese Association, who served from 1959 until 1974. Loke Siew Fook, who was the new Minister of Transport, replaced Lim Kit Siang as DAP parliamentary leader on 11 July 2018 for the 14th Dewan Rakyat session.

2020–2022 Malaysian political crisis

On 24 February 2020, the DAP became the largest party in the Dewan Rakyat for the first time after 11 out of 50 PKR MPs resigned during the political crisis. UMNO had also lost 16 out of 54 MPs over several months, mostly through defections to Bersatu. Even though it lost power, the 42 MPs of the DAP remained intact.

However, a few state assemblymen defected. On 9 March 2020, Paul Yong and A Sivasubramaniam quit the party to join the new Perikatan Nasional state government in Perak. The next day on 10 March, DAP expelled Norhizam Hassan Baktee, Pengkalan Batu assemblyman, after he decided to support the new PN state government in Melaka. DAP also expelled a nominated Sabah assemblyman, Ronnie Loh, for supporting the PN's treacherous attempt to topple the Warisan Plus Sabah state government led by Shafie Apdal.

One assemblyman who did not defect but became disillusioned with the party's direction and management was Padungan assemblyman and Sarawak DAP vice-chairman Wong King Wei, who resigned on 27 July 2020 claiming that the party had deviated from the aims, objectives and struggle of the earlier days when he joined in 2006. He stayed on as an independent until his term ended in 2021.

Ethnic diversity
DAP was founded by Chen Man Hin and Devan Nair, who were ethnic Chinese and Indian respectively. The majority of DAP's party membership is of ethnic Chinese and Indian heritage, with most elected positions within the party being held by Chinese or Indian members. The party's first Malay Member of Parliament, Ahmad Nor, only won his seat in the 1990 general election, The DAP also only gained its first native Sabahan (Kadazandusun) legislator in the 2013 election, Edwin Jack Bosi who sat in Sabah State Legislative Assembly. The lack of Malay members within the party has led to DAP being viewed as a "racist" or "anti-Malay" party by political opponents in that it is exclusively concerned with the issues of the Chinese or Indian communities that they viewed were orchastrated by Malays.

Allegations of racism and chauvinism 
Despite constant rebuttals by party leaders, DAP has been depicted by their political opponents, especially from UMNO, as a party that favours the Malaysian Chinese minority above others. This allegation of racial chauvinism culminated in a two-piece television program broadcast on government-controlled TV channel Radio Televisyen Malaysia (RTM) entitled "Bahaya Cauvinisme", which translates to "Dangers of Chauvinism". The program forced then party leader Lim Kit Siang to issue a formal media statement to counter the allegations.

On 15 November 2011, Ismail Sabri Yaakob, the Malaysian Minister for Domestic Trade, Co-operatives and Consumerism, accused DAP's publicity chief, Tony Pua of racism for making repeated attacks against the Kedai Rakyat 1Malaysia, a government initiative to supply cheap retail products to Malaysian consumers. Tony Pua was criticised for singling out Kedai Rakyat 1Malaysia, whose suppliers to the store generally come from the Malaysian Bumiputra community, and for not investigating the quality of products supplied by Malaysian-Chinese suppliers or making similar accusations against independent Malaysian-Chinese stores.

Allegations of racism have forced DAP party leader Lim Guan Eng to issue a formal denial in the Penang High Court.

Party symbols

Party logo 
The symbol or logo of the DAP (see above) is the rocket, which it has used since the 1969 general election. Its components are symbolised as follows:

 The red rocket symbolises the Party's aspiration for a modern, dynamic and progressive society
 The four rocket boosters represent the support and drive given to the Party objectives by the three major ethnicities (Malay, Chinese, Indian) and others
 The blue circle stands for the unity of the multi-racial people of Malaysia
 The white background stands for purity and incorruptibility

Ubah mascot 

In 2008, DAP initially introduced "Rocket Kid", a rocket as the party's official mascot during the 12th Malaysian general election. This was then changed to Ubah bird, a hornbill which was designed by Ooi Leng Hang and was launched during the Sarawak state election in 2011 and also used as part of their political campaigning during the 13th Malaysian general election in 2013. DAP had adopted this bird as a symbol for change both for its unique characteristics, hardiness and representation of the unity of both East Malaysia and West Malaysia into a Malaysian nation. Its merchandise such as plush toys, buttons and car stickers were very well received by the public. The idea of the mascot came from Sarawak DAP Secretary, Chong Chieng Jen, who felt a mascot would boost the spirit of the people. The name "Ubah", which means "change" in Malay, is in line with the party's aspirations in changing the ruling party of the Malaysian federal government. In addition to its original Sarawak Iban costume, "Ubah" now comes in a Malay costume for Hari Raya, Indian costume for Deepavali, Chinese costume for Chinese New Year, Santa Claus costume for Christmas, and a Superman costume that depicts the power of the people. On 13 July 2013, a gigantic float known as the "Ubah Inflatable Bird (Water Ubah)" was officially launched at IJM Promenade, Jelutong, Penang by DAP Secretary General Lim Guan Eng.

Songs 
DAP's official party anthem is Berjuang Untuk Rakyat Malaysia (Fighting for Malaysians).

Other than the official party anthem, DAP has also unveiled several theme songs and music videos mostly with an Ubah theme such as "Ubah" with over 1,000,000 views, 明天 with over 500,000 views and "Ubah Rocket Style" with over 300,000 views, which is a parody of the viral YouTube hit "Gangnam Style".

Leadership structure

Central Executive Committee 

The Central Executive Committee (CEC) serves as the party's executive body and its 30 members are elected by party delegates during a national congress held every three years. The CEC, in turn, elects the party's national leadership from among its own members, including the Secretary-General, in whom executive power is vested. The current Secretary-General is Minister of Transport Anthony Loke. The latest leadership structure can be found below.

 Advisor
 Tan Kok Wai
 National Chairman:
 Lim Guan Eng
 National Deputy Chairman:
 Gobind Singh Deo
 National Vice Chairman:
 Chow Kon Yeow
 Nga Kor Ming
 Kulasegaran Murugeson
 Teresa Kok Suh Sim
 Chong Chieng Jen
 Secretary-General:
 Anthony Loke Siew Fook
 Deputy Secretaries-General:
 Liew Chin Tong
 Sivakumar Varatharaju Naidu
 Tengku Zulpuri Shah Raja Puji
 National Treasurer:
 Fong Kui Lun
 Assistant National Treasurer:
 Ng Sze Han
 National Organising Secretary:
 Steven Sim Chee Keong
 Assistant National Organising Secretary:
 Ng Suee Lim
 Khoo Poay Tiong
 National Publicity Secretary:
 Teo Nie Ching
 Assistant National Publicity Secretary:
 Hannah Yeoh Tseow Suan
 Ganabatirau Veraman
 Political Education Director:
 Wong Kah Woh
 Assistant Political Education Director:
 Wong Shu Qi
 International Secretary:
 Jannie Lasimbang
 Assistant International Secretary:
 Kasthuriraani Patto
 5 Men Committee Members:
 Anthony Loke Siew Fook
 Lim Guan Eng
 Kulasegaran Murugeson
 Gobind Singh Deo
 Nga Kor Ming

 Committee members:
 Tan Kok Wai
 Lim Lip Eng
 Lim Hui Ying
 Alice Lau Kiong Yieng
 Chan Foong Hin
 Ronnie Liu Tian Khiew
 Tan Hong Pin
 Young Syefura Othman
 Teo Kok Seong
 Su Keong Siong
 Wu Him Ven
 Syahredzan Johan
 Lee Chin Chen
 Howard Lee Chuan How
 Vivian Wong Shir Yee
 Sanisvara Nethaji Rayer Rajaji Rayer
 Sheikh Umar Bagharib Ali
 Parliamentary Leader:
 Nga Kor Ming
 Women Chief:
 Chong Eng
 Socialist Youth Chief:
 Kelvin Yii Lee Wuen
 Central Policy and Strategic Planning Commission Chairman:
 Lim Kit Siang
 State Chairman:
 Johor: Liew Chin Tong
 Kedah: Tan Kok Yew
 Kelantan: Azaha Abdul Rani
 Malacca: Tey Kok Kiew 
 Negeri Sembilan: Anthony Loke Siew Fook
 Pahang: Leong Ngah Ngah
 Penang: Chow Kon Yeow
 Perak: David Nga Kor Ming
 Perlis: Teh Seng Chuan
 Sabah: Frankie Poon Ming Fung
 Sarawak: Chong Chieng Jen
 Selangor: Gobind Singh Deo
 Terengganu: Ng Chai Hing
 Federal Territory of Kuala Lumpur: Tan Kok Wai
 Federal Territory of Labuan: Han Fook Chiew
 Deputy State Chairman:
 Johor: Teo Nie Ching
 Kedah: Siau Suen Miin 
 Kelantan: Wong Tiam Guey
 Malacca: Saminathan Ganesan
 Negeri Sembilan: Gulasekaran Palasamy
 Pahang: Manogaran Marimuthu
 Penang: Ramasamy Palanisamy
 Perak: Sivakumar Varatharaju
 Perlis: Weng Sang @ Wong Siak Kim
 Sabah: Peter Saili
 Sarawak: Alice Lau Kiong Yieng
 Selangor: Ean Yong Hian Wah
 Terengganu: Mohd Nasir Zainal
 Federal Territory of Kuala Lumpur: Fong Kui Lun
 Federal Territory of Labuan: Koh Chien Chee

Lists of the leaders of the Democratic Action Party

Life Advisor

Advisor

Mentor

National Chairmen

Secretaries-General

Acting Secretaries-General

Note: The Acting Secretary-General is appointed when the Secretary-General is incapable of carrying out their duties or if the position is vacated before an election can be held.. Lim Kit Siang was elected as Secretary-General in October 1969 while detained under the ISA and Fan Yew Teng was Acting Secretary-General. Chong Eng took over for Kerk Kim Hock while the latter sought treatment for rectal cancer. M. Kulasegaran was Acting Secretary-General after Kerk Kim Hock lost his seat in parliament and resigned before Lim Guan Eng was elected Secretary-General.

Chairman of the Central Policy and Strategic Planning Commission

Note: Chairman of the Central Policy and Strategic Planning Commission is a newly created position on 2004 when Lim Kit Siang refused to be re-elected as Chairman of DAP.

Parliamentary Leaders

Elected representatives

Dewan Negara (Senate)

Senators 

 His Majesty's appointee:
 Roderick Wong Siew Lead	
 Noorita Sual
 Penang State Legislative Assembly:
 Lingeshwaran R. Arunasalam
 Selangor State Legislative Assembly:
 
 Negeri Sembilan State Legislative Assembly:
 Kesavadas A. Achyuthan Nair

Dewan Rakyat (House of Representatives)

Members of Parliament of the 15th Malaysian Parliament 

DAP has 40 members in the House of Representatives.

Dewan Undangan Negeri (State Legislative Assembly)

Malaysian State Assembly Representatives 

Penang State Legislative Assembly
Perak State Legislative Assembly
Selangor State Legislative Assembly
Negeri Sembilan State Legislative Assembly

Johor State Legislative Assembly
Pahang State Legislative Assembly
Sabah State Legislative Assembly

Malacca State Legislative Assembly
Sarawak State Legislative Assembly
Kedah State Legislative Assembly

Perlis State Legislative Assembly
Terengganu State Legislative Assembly
Kelantan State Legislative Assembly

DAP state governments

General election results

State election results

See also 
 List of political parties in Malaysia
 Pakatan Harapan
 Politics of Malaysia

References

Notes 

 James Chin. The Sarawak Chinese Voters and their support for the Democratic Action Party (DAP), Southeast Asian Studies, Vol. 34, No. 2, 1996, pp 387–401
 James Chin. The Malaysian Chinese Dilemma: The Never Ending Policy (NEP), Chinese Southern Diaspora Studies, Vol 3, 2009

Further reading

External links 

 
 DAP RoketKini.com (DAP Malay Language News)
 DAP Penang home page
 DAP Sarawak home page

 
1965 establishments in Malaysia
Centre-left parties in Asia
Political parties in Malaysia
Political parties established in 1965
Progressive Alliance
Social democratic parties in Asia
Social liberal parties